Naim Sharifi (born 3 June 1992) is a Russian-Tajik footballer. He plays for Austrian fourth-tier Landesliga Burgenland club UFC Markt Allhau.

Club career
He has played for reserves team of FC Lokomotiv Moscow in 2009 and 2010. He did not play for the professional Russian Second Division farm-club called FC Lokomotiv-2 Moscow as it is sometimes erroneously reported.

He made his debut in the Russian Premier League on 3 November 2012 for FC Amkar Perm in a game against FC Kuban Krasnodar.

References

1992 births
Sportspeople from Dushanbe
Tajikistani emigrants to Russia
Living people
Russian footballers
Russia youth international footballers
Association football defenders
Kapfenberger SV players
FC Lokomotiv Moscow players
FC Amkar Perm players
SK Sturm Graz players
FC Fakel Voronezh players
FK Jelgava players
DSV Leoben players
Russian Premier League players
Austrian Football Bundesliga players
2. Liga (Austria) players
Latvian Higher League players
Russian expatriate footballers
Russian expatriate sportspeople in Austria
Russian expatriate sportspeople in Latvia
Expatriate footballers in Austria
Expatriate footballers in Latvia